I Feel Like a Newman is an album by jazz trumpeter Joe Newman recorded in 1956 and originally released on the Storyville label.

Reception

Allmusic awarded the album 4 stars stating "the music always swings and the talented musicians are in fine form".

Track listing
 "This Time the Dream's on Me" (Harold Arlen, Johnny Mercer) - 3:15
 "Imagination" (Jimmy Van Heusen, Johnny Burke) - 3:24
 "Midgets" (Joe Newman) - 4:45
 "Sweetie Cake" (Ernie Wilkins) - 4:44
 "East of the Sun" (Brooks Bowman) - 5:05
 "Diffugalty" (Osie Johnston) - 3:12
 "I Feel Like a Newman" (Manny Albam) - 2:51
 "King Size" (Wilkins) - 6:38
 "Gee, Baby, Ain't I Good to You" (Andy Razaf, Don Redman) - 4:11
 "My Blue Heaven" (Walter Donaldson, George A. Whiting) - 3:38

Personnel 
Joe Newman- trumpet
Billy Byers - trombone (tracks 1-3 & 6-9)
Gene Quill - alto saxophone (tracks 1-3 & 6-9)
Frank Foster - tenor saxophone (tracks 1-3 & 6-9)
Frank Wess - tenor saxophone, flute (tracks 4, 5, 10 & 11) 
John Lewis (tracks 1-3 & 6-9), Sir Charles Thompson (tracks 4, 5, 10 & 11) - piano
Freddie Green - guitar (tracks 1-3 & 6-9)
Milt Hinton (tracks 1-3 & 6-9), Eddie Jones (tracks 4, 5, 10 & 11) - bass
Osie Johnson (tracks 1-3 & 6-9), Shadow Wilson (tracks 4, 5, 10 & 11)  - drums

References 

1956 albums
Storyville Records (George Wein's) albums
Joe Newman (trumpeter) albums
Albums arranged by Manny Albam
Albums arranged by Ernie Wilkins